Darren Gardiner (born 19 November 1969) is an Australian Paralympic powerlifter. He has won two Paralympic silver medals in the Men's Over 100 kg powerlifting event. He did not medal at the 2012 Games.

Personal
Gardiner was born on 19 November 1969. In 1994, at the age of 24, his left leg was amputated below the knee due to cancer. He works as a sales manager. He moved from Brisbane to Perth in 2006. He weighs . Gardiner is also known by the nickname of 'The Bear'. Gardiner was given this nickname because of his unusual pre-lift behaviour which sees him roar like a bear.

Powerlifting
Gardiner started powerlifting in 1995, and first represented Australia in 1998.  He competes in the Over 100 kg men division. He has had the nickname "the bear" since 1997 because of the loud roaring noise he makes during competition. , he is ranked second in the world. , his personal best lift is 235 kg.

He competed at the 2000 Sydney Paralympics but did not win a medal. At the 2004 Athens Games, he won a silver medal in the Men's Over 100 kg event, when he lifted 227.5 kg. He repeated his silver medal performance in the same event at the 2008 Summer Paralympics.

He has competed at several other events outside the Paralympics. In 2006, he finished second at the World Championships. That year, he took a bronze at the 2006 Melbourne Commonwealth Games. He won a silver medal in 2007 at the European Open. He did not compete for most of 2010 due to injury.  At the 2011 Oceania Paralympic Championships, part of the Arafura Games, he finished first with a score of 230, 70 more than second place competitor Abebe Fekadu. He was selected to compete at the 2012 London Paralympics. He did not medal at the 2012 Games, missing out on a bronze medal by 1 kg. His retirement was announced in December 2012. Darren's retirement marked the end of his successful 15-year career.

References

External links
 

Paralympic powerlifters of Australia
Powerlifters at the 2000 Summer Paralympics
Powerlifters at the 2004 Summer Paralympics
Powerlifters at the 2006 Commonwealth Games
Powerlifters at the 2008 Summer Paralympics
Powerlifters at the 2012 Summer Paralympics
Medalists at the 2004 Summer Paralympics
Medalists at the 2008 Summer Paralympics
Paralympic silver medalists for Australia
Commonwealth Games bronze medallists for Australia
Amputee category Paralympic competitors
Australian amputees
Sportspeople from Brisbane
Sportspeople from Perth, Western Australia
1969 births
Living people
Commonwealth Games medallists in weightlifting
Paralympic medalists in powerlifting
20th-century Australian people
21st-century Australian people
Medallists at the 2006 Commonwealth Games